Ali Eid (Arabic:علي عيد) (born 1 March 1998) is an Emirati footballer. He currently plays as a forward for Al Ain .

Career

Al-Ain
Ali Eid started his career at Al Ain and is a product of the Al-Ain's youth system. On 10 January 2017, Ali Eid made his professional debut for Al-Ain against Hatta in the Pro League, replacing Saeed Al-Kathiri.

Dinamo Zagreb Academy
On 11 September 2018 , Ali Eid joined Dinamo Zagreb Academy on loan one season on loan from Al Ain .

Al-Fujairah
On 8 July 2020, Eid joined Al-Fujairah on loan one season on loan from Al Ain .

External links

References

1998 births
Living people
Emirati footballers
Emirati expatriate footballers
Olympic footballers of the United Arab Emirates
Al Ain FC players
GNK Dinamo Zagreb players
Fujairah FC players
UAE Pro League players
Association football forwards
Expatriate footballers in Croatia
Emirati expatriate sportspeople in Croatia
Place of birth missing (living people)
Footballers at the 2018 Asian Games
Asian Games bronze medalists for the United Arab Emirates
Asian Games medalists in football
Medalists at the 2018 Asian Games